Seoul Street Arts Festival is the largest street arts festival in Korea providing high-standard street performances which mainly combined popularity and artistry. It is opened to public all over Seoul with no charge. Starting from 2003 with its original name, ‘Hi Seoul Festival’, it established itself as a festival specialized in street art in 2013. From 2016, it changed its name to <Seoul Street Arts Festival> to consolidate its identity. The festival works as an art market by helping the selected pieces to be distributed and to be expanded into local and international art festivals. Now, it is becoming a street arts festival which represents Asia.

Seoul Street Arts Festival's performance program consists of two parts; which are “Official program” and “Off program”. There are programs that even citizens can easily participate in. Furthermore, citizens over 18 can join the festival as volunteers, which are called ‘Gil-dong-e’. This indicates “People moving on the road”, and their main roles are to plan the festival and to deal with the overall management and operation of it. About 300 people perform as ‘Gil-dong-e’ every year.

Seoul Street Arts festival(SSAF 2018) will be held from October 4th(Thu) to 7th(Sun), for 4 days, in the center of Seoul including Seoul Plaza, Cheonggye Plaza, Gwanghwamun Square, SejongDaero, Cheonggyecheonro, Deoksu Palace Stone Road, Urban regeneration place, Seoul Museum of Art, Seoul citizen hall.

Gallery of Hi! Seoul Festival events

References

External links 

SSAF Official site
SSAF Facebook
SSAF Instagram
 SSAF youtube
 2017 SSAF - Official Seoul Tourism

Festivals in Seoul